Gorazd Mihajlov (born 21 August 1974) is a Macedonian football coach and former player.

He has coached numerous clubs in Europe and Middle East, and has also coached the Macedonia women's national football team.

Club career
Born in Skopje, SR Macedonia, he played with FK Vardar, FK Pelister, FK Kumanovo and FK Skopje in Macedonia, before moving to Germany to play with Chemnitzer FC. He played with German side Wismut Aue in the season 1992–93. During the winter break of the season 1993–94 he left Chemnitzer and signed with Publikum Celje playing with them in the 1993–94 Slovenian PrvaLiga. Next summer he moved to another Slovenian top-fligh club, NK Kočevje. After Slvenia, his next stop was Scandinavia, first with Ljungskile SK in the 1995 Swedish Division 1 and next with Hvidovre IF in the 1996–97 Danish Superliga then with FK Čukarički in the First League of FR Yugoslavia, before returning to Macedonia to play with FK Pelister in the 1999–2000 First Macedonian Football League.

International career
Mihajlov was also member of the Yugoslav U19 and Macedonian U21 teams.

Managerial career
Mihajlov started his coaching career in Iceland with Höttur.

Sep 2006-Dec 11: Höttur
Jan 2012-Mar 12: Ohrid
Jul 2012-Nov 12: Pelister
Apr 2012-Apr 13: Macedonia Women
Mar 2013-Jul 13: Teteks
Jul 2013-Feb 14: Napredok
Feb 2014-Mar 14: Rudar Prijedor
Jun 2014-Jan 15: Al-Qadisiyah FC (assistant)
Jan 2015-May 16: Teteks
Jul 2016-Oct 16: Pelister
Oct 2016-Nov 17: Hatta Club (assistant)
Jan 2018-Jun 18: Al Dhafra FC (assistant)
Jul 2018-Jan 21: Borec
Jun 2021-: Sileks

Honours

As coach
Teteks
Macedonian Cup: 2012–13

References

External links
 Football-Lineups Profile
 

1974 births
Living people
Footballers from Skopje
Association football midfielders
Macedonian footballers
North Macedonia under-21 international footballers
FC Erzgebirge Aue players
NK Celje players
NK Kočevje players
Ljungskile SK players
Hvidovre IF players
FK Vardar players
FK Čukarički players
FK Pelister players
FK Milano Kumanovo players
Regionalliga players
Slovenian PrvaLiga players
Ettan Fotboll players
Danish Superliga players
Macedonian First Football League players
Macedonian expatriate footballers
Expatriate footballers in Germany
Macedonian expatriate sportspeople in Germany
Expatriate footballers in Slovenia
Macedonian expatriate sportspeople in Slovenia
Expatriate footballers in Sweden
Macedonian expatriate sportspeople in Sweden
Expatriate men's footballers in Denmark
Macedonian expatriate sportspeople in Denmark
Expatriate footballers in Serbia and Montenegro
Macedonian expatriate sportspeople in Serbia and Montenegro
Expatriate footballers in Greece
Macedonian expatriate sportspeople in Greece
Expatriate footballers in Iceland
Macedonian expatriate sportspeople in Iceland
Macedonian football managers
FK Ohrid managers
FK Pelister managers
FK Teteks managers
FK Napredok managers
FK Rudar Prijedor managers
FK Borec managers
Macedonian expatriate football managers
Expatriate football managers in Iceland
Expatriate footballers in Bosnia and Herzegovina
Macedonian expatriate sportspeople in Bosnia and Herzegovina
Macedonian expatriate sportspeople in Saudi Arabia
Íþróttafélagið Höttur players